The 2007 Eastbourne Borough Council election took place on 3 May 2007 to elect members of Eastbourne Borough Council in East Sussex, England. The whole council was up for election and the Liberal Democrats gained overall control of the council from the Conservative Party.

Background
After the 2006 election the Conservatives controlled the council with a majority of 3, with 15 seats, compared to 12 for the Liberal Democrats. For 2007 the council changed from the previous system whereby a third of the council was elected each year, to instead have the whole council elected every 4 years, after a unanimous vote by the council. Earlier in 2007 Norman Marsh left the Liberal Democrats to sit as an Independent, while Liberal Democrat Irene Sims resigned from the council.

A record 89 candidates stood at the election, up from the previous high of 81 in 2002 when the entire council was last elected. Both the Conservatives and Liberal Democrats stood a full 27 candidates, compared to 12 for Labour, 9 Green Party and 5 UK Independence Party. Councillors standing down at the election included Conservatives Patrick Bowker and David Stevens, Liberal Democrat Robert Slater and independent Norman Marsh.

Election result
The Liberal Democrats made 9 gains to take control of the council from the Conservatives for the first time since 2004, with 8 of the gains being from the Conservatives. The Liberal Democrats gained seats in Old Town, Sovereign and Upperton wards to hold 20 seats and have a majority of 13, while the Conservatives were reduced to 7 seats. The Conservatives losses included the leader of the council, Ian Lucas, in Old Town and the cabinet member for finance, Chris Williams, in Sovereign. Overall turnout at the election was 42.26%, compared to 40.70% in 2006.

The Liberal Democrat victory was attributed to the introduction of parking charges in Eastbourne by Conservative controlled East Sussex County Council and to a decision by borough councillors to increase their expenses by 52%. Following the election David Tutt became the new leader of the council, while the national Liberal Democrat Leader Menzies Campbell came to Eastbourne to celebrate the result.

Ward results

References

2007
2007 English local elections
2000s in East Sussex